The European Institute of Innovation and Technology (EIT) is an independent body of the European Union with juridical personality, established in 2008 intended to strengthen Europe's ability to innovate. The EIT’s three “core pillars” of activities are: entrepreneurial education programmes and courses across Europe that transform students into entrepreneurs; business creation and acceleration services that scale ideas and budding businesses; and innovation-driven research projects that turn ideas into products by connecting partners, investors, and expertise.

As part of the EU's Framework Program for Research and Innovation ‘Horizon Europe’ under Pillar 3 ‘Innovative Europe’, the EIT contributes to achieving the four key strategic orientations of the Horizon Europe Strategic Plan. These are: promoting an open strategic autonomy by leading the development of key digital, enabling and emerging technologies, sectors and value chains; restoring Europe’s ecosystems and biodiversity and managing sustainably natural resources; making Europe the first digitally-enabled circular, climate-neutral and sustainable economy; creating a more resilient, inclusive and democratic European society. The EIT is funded through Horizon Europe.

Since its creation in 2008, the EIT has created the largest innovation community in Europe that has achieved the following:

 Designated 9 EIT Knowledge and Innovation Communities;
 Established more than 70 on-the-ground locations across Europe;
 Partnered with more than 3.200 European businesses and academic institutions;
 Created more than 1.600 new products and services;
 Supported more than 5.600 ventures who have gone on to raise more than EUR 6 billion;
 Created more than 17.400 jobs;
 Educated more than 4.600 Masters and PhD graduates through EIT programmes.

Mission 
The EIT’s official mission is set in its founding document: Regulation (EU) 2021/819 of the European Parliament and of the Council of 20 May 2021 on the European Institute of Innovation and Technology (recast). It states: The EIT’s mission is to contribute to sustainable Union economic growth and competitiveness by reinforcing the innovation capacity of the Union and Member States in order to address major challenges faced by society. It shall do this by promoting synergies, integration and cooperation among higher education, research and innovation of the highest standards, including by fostering entrepreneurship, thereby strengthening the innovation ecosystems across the Union in an open and transparent manner. The EU Parliament and the Council update the EIT’s objectives and agenda every 7 years, the current agenda being for the 2021-2027 period. While the main purpose of the EIT remains increasing EU economic growth and competitiveness, over the years, it has increased its role as part of other core EU objectives like fulfilling the UN Sustainable Development Goals (SDGs) and working as part of the Horizon 2020 (now Horizon Europe) research and innovation scheme. The EIT combines these goals by using its network in research, business, and higher education to promote start-ups and inventions that directly contribute to the SDGs and give Europe an edge in the market of future technologies.

The EIT Knowledge Triangle 
The EIT bases its operations on the concept of the knowledge triangle – the trio of higher education, business, and research. This concept emphasises the creation of a positive feedback loop between these actors, where one actor’s success can then contribute to new avenues of success for the two others. It sees the cooperation of the knowledge triangle as a basis for addressing challenges like global digital transformation, climate change, resource over-consumption, pandemics, and more. It entails:

 Creating products, services, and business models that are equipped to deal with global challenges
 Equipping students with the skills to become entrepreneurs in STEM-related domains
 Creating start-ups and accelerating venture scale-ups that increase EU global competitiveness

The knowledge triangle is designed to encourage officials, businesses, and researchers to make compromises and improve their collaboration to reap better the benefits of the positive feedback loop of innovation.

Organisation

The Governing Board 
The EIT Governing Board is the principal governing body entrusted with the strategic leadership of the Institute and the overall direction of its operational activities. It is autonomous in its decision-making and is responsible for the selection, evaluation, and support given to the EIT Knowledge and Innovation Communities (KICs).

The EIT Governing Board has 15 members (experts in higher education, research, business, and innovation at the EU level) as well as one independent observer from the European Commission.
The list of the current Governing Board members:

 Chair of the EIT Governing Board and Executive Committee, Nektarios Tavernarakis
 Executive Committee member, Martina Larkin
 Executive Committee member, Janis Grevins
 Executive Committee member, Razvan Nicolescu
 Executive Committee member, Attila Vegh
 Mark Boris Andrijanic
 Heinrich Arnold
 Maria Gabriella Colucci
 Stefan Dobrev
 Jan Figel 
 Nora Khaldi
 Silvia Lenaerts
 Paul Rübig
 Pia Sandvik
 Inga Skisaker

 European Commission Observer, Viviane Hoffmann

EIT management team and executive directors 
The EIT Director is supported by the Director’s office and the Legal section, together with the Heads of Operations I, II, and the Administrative Unit. Apart from the management, the EIT consists of the following Units:

 Operations I – Knowledge and Innovation Communities
 Operations II – Innovation, Education and Communication
 Administrative Unit

The current Director of the EIT is Martin Kern.

Locations 
The EIT main office is located in Budapest, Hungary, in the 11th district's Neumann Janos utca (Infopark, Budapest Science park). 

In 2017, the EIT House was opened in Brussels, Belgium. It is home to the EIT Liaison Office, which serves as the hub of relations between the EIT in Budapest and EU Institutions, such as the European Commission, the European Parliament, the Council of Europe Union, other EU bodies, and EIT stakeholders worldwide.

Knowledge and Innovation Communities (KICS) 
In practice, the integration of the knowledge triangle results in the creation of trans-national partnerships called EIT Knowledge and Innovation Communities (EIT KICs). Each KIC is dedicated to giving Europe a competitive edge in different domains such as healthcare or digital technology. At the same time, the KICs promote inventions and entrepreneurs whose work specifically contribute to the SDGs (for example, more sustainable battery manufacturing or substitutes for petrol-based plastics). KIC support to entrepreneurs and start-ups can take the form of direct investment, trainings and education courses, awards, networking, marketing, and incubation and acceleration programmes. The EIT, in turn, funds, monitors, and coordinates the KICs. The KICs must regularly provide proof of progress to the EIT to pass evaluations. 

There are currently nine KICs and each focus on a different societal challenge (EIT Culture and Creativity will be fully operational in 2023). The KICs and their slogans are as follow:

 EIT Climate-KIC: Drivers of climate innovation in Europe and beyond

 EIT Digital: For a strong, digital Europe
 EIT Food: EIT Food connects businesses, research centres, universities and consumers.
 EIT Health: Together for healthy lives in Europe
 EIT InnoEnergy: Pioneering change in sustainable energy
 EIT Manufacturing: Strengthening and increasing the competitiveness of Europe's manufacturing
 EIT Raw Materials: Developing raw materials into a major strength for Europe
 EIT Urban Mobility: Smart, green and integrated transport
 EIT Culture and Creativity: Transforming Europe’s Cultural and Creative Sectors

The EIT plans to launch a new KIC for Water, Marine and Maritime Sectors and Ecosystems between 2026 and 2027 upon approval by the EU Parliament and the Council.

Each KIC is set up as a legal entity and has an appointed CEO to run operations. The EIT gives KICs the autonomy to define their legal status, internal organisation, and working methods. This is to provide KICs with flexibility in the face of new challenges and changing environments.

Participation and Funding 
The EIT is part of the Horizon Europe Framework Programme for Research and Innovation 2021-2027. At the start of 2021, it became part of Pillar 3 - Open Innovation of Horizon Europe. The Horizon Europe Regulation states that the KICs are institutionalised European Partnerships and, as such, they shall deliver clear impacts for the European Union and their citizens.

The EIT Member State Representatives Group (MSRG) 
The new EIT Regulation and the EIT Strategic Innovation Agenda for 2021-2027 established the EIT Member State Representatives Group (MSRG). The MSRG advises the EIT Governing Board and the EIT Director on strategically important issues, such as the extension or termination of the EIT’s partnership agreements and the conclusion of a memorandum of cooperation with each KIC. It also facilitates interaction between EIT Community and national or regional activities, sharing information about potential national and regional co-financing.

The MSRG is composed of a representative and a substitute from each EU Member State and each Associated Country to Horizon Europe. They are delegated at the invitation of the European Commission.  Members come from ministries or national authorities responsible for the EIT and must demonstrate relevant knowledge and understanding of Horizon Europe, as well as national and EU-level innovation policies.

The MSRG meets at least twice a year and is co-chaired by the EIT Director and a Representative nominated by the MSRG. Representatives of the European Commission (from DG EAC), the EIT Governing Board, and the CEOs of the KICs may be invited to attend the meetings to align better the work carried out by the group.

Enlargement and the Regional Innovation Scheme (RIS) 
In 2014, the EIT introduced the Regional Innovation Scheme (EIT RIS) to provide more equal footing for countries and regions across Europe with “moderate” and “modest” innovation scores. Scores are defined by the European Innovation Scoreboard (EIS). The EIS compares performance indicators in EU countries and regional neighbours to summarise the relative strengths and weaknesses of their national innovation systems. The RIS scheme addresses the countries where local innovation communities have fewer or no partners and have limited or no participation in the activities of the EIT Community. 

The EIT RIS expanded EIT Community activities to more countries and regions. Between 2021 and 2024, the following EU Member States joined the EIT RIS:

 EU-member states: Bulgaria, Croatia, Cyprus, Czech Republic, Estonia, Greece, Hungary, Italy, Latvia, Lithuania, Malta, Poland, Portugal, Romania, Slovakia, Slovenia, and Spain.
 Horizon Europe Associated Countries: Montenegro, Republic of North Macedonia, Serbia, Turkey, Ukraine.
 Outermost Regions: Guadeloupe, French Guiana, Réunion, Martinique, Mayotte and Saint-Martin (France), the Azores and Madeira (Portugal), and the Canary Islands (Spain).

The EIT also facilitates RIS countries’ access to KIC services and programmes, such as funding and improvements to their local innovation ecosystem.

EIT Hub Silicon Valley 
EIT Hub Silicon Valley, created in 2019, is an outreach location of the EIT within the United States. The Hub creates synergies between the EIT community and Silicon Valley to support the growth of start-ups and increase the number of Europe-California projects. It serves to attract American customers, partners, and investors by showcasing European inventions. It is also used as a liaison office between European and American innovation networks.

EIT Hub Silicon Valley focuses its activities in: 

 Supporting the recruitment of American students to Europe and facilitating internships for EU students in the US
 Assisting European entrepreneurs with business in the US
 Developing contacts for participating KICs and their partners (especially universities)
 Creating a network that includes the EU Delegation, European Consulates, T&I Offices, and more.

Grants offered 
The EU provides funding for a broad range of projects and programmes. Funding is managed according to the EU Financial Regulation to ensure there is tight control and transparency over how funds are used and spent. Funds can be provided in the form of grants for specific projects in relation to EU policies, usually following a public announcement known as a “call for proposals.” Part of the funding comes from the EU.

OPERATIONS AND ACTIVITIES

Higher Education Programmes

EIT Entrepreneurial Education 
The EIT KICs develop their own education programmes based on the knowledge triangle concept. These programmes focus on teaching entrepreneurship and STEM skills, particularly in what the EU calls “deep tech” which includes artificial intelligence, blockchain, and renewable energy.

The HEI Initiative 
The Higher Education Institution (HEI) Initiative was conceived based on the EIT’s observation that European higher education did not sufficiently prepare students to be entrepreneurs in STEM fields. The goal of the Initiative is therefore to provide expertise and coaching on these fields within partnered institutions. It also gives students access to the EIT network and funding.

Stakeholder relationship-building 
The EIT works alongside a broad array of stakeholders and partners:

 The European Commission, the European Parliament, and the Council of the EU, who determine the funding and long-term strategy.
 National and regional governments – both EU Member States and Horizon Europe Associated Countries – who use the EIT to learn from each other, cooperate on joint initiatives, and ensure that national stakeholders are connected to the opportunities provided by the EIT Community.
 The Knowledge and Innovation Communities (KICs) – who showcase the work of innovators, share best practices, and make activities accessible in Europe and beyond.

Every year, the EIT organises the EIT Stakeholder Forum to engage with these stakeholders and partners.

The flagship event of the EIT is “INNOVEIT”, an annual event that includes multiple conferences across Europe showcasing different parts of the EIT Community. It concludes with the EIT Summit in Brussels, where important future projects are unveiled. INNOVEIT also includes the EIT Awards, which award the EIT’s most innovative ventures, entrepreneurial graduates, best innovation teams, and best women leaders. The nominees are chosen by their KICs for ground-breaking products, projects, and services that tackle global challenges.

Alumni Community 
The EIT Alumni Community is an interdisciplinary and multicultural network of networks, bringing together professionals from different countries and sectors.

Impact Framework 
The EIT has developed an impact framework that is aligned with Horizon Europe’s key impact pathways. It defines the socioeconomic impacts that the EIT Community will deliver by 2027 and demonstrates their strategic alignment with the EIT mission and high-level objectives. It underpins the EIT Strategic Innovation Agenda 2021–2027 (EIT SIA 2021–2027).The framework creates a basis for performing impact evaluations in a systematic and evidence-based manner as well as a results-based investment approach[ME1] [YB2] . That includes tools to measure the EIT’s contribution to [ME3] innovation, knowledge triangle integration, economic development, and addressing societal challenges, thus demonstrating the impact of the EIT’s investment.

History

Foundation and Objective 
On 11 March 2008, the European Parliament and the Council signed the Regulation (EC) No 294/2008, establishing the European Institute of Innovation and Technology. The goal was to foster the integration of the knowledge triangle — higher education, research, and innovation — across the European Union. The rationale behind the establishment of the EIT was the EU’s attempt to re-launch its Lisbon Strategy, signed in 2000, focusing on a ‘growth and job’ agenda. The EIT was, therefore, an attempt to redefine the European Commission mandates and governance of higher education institutions as part of a knowledge-based economy route to economic and social development.

On 18 June 2008, HQ were established in Budapest, Hungary and on 15 September 2008 the inaugural meeting of EIT Governing Board was held. There, Martin Schuurmans was elected Chair of the Board.

Initial Phase (2008-2011) 
As determined in the Regulation establishing EIT, within 12 months after its creation, the Governing Board had to submit the draft of the first rolling triennial work programme and, within a period of 18 months, select and designate two or three KICs.   

The topics of the first wave of KICs (climate, energy, digital) were selected based on the criteria for selection described in Article 7 (“Selection of KICs”) in December 2009. Article 7 was open to some degree of interpretation and the Governing Board working group was essential in shaping a common understanding of each potential KIC. For instance, the concept of EIT Climate-KIC was defined as climate change mitigation and adaptation; KIC InnoEnergy (now InnoEnergy) was focused on sustainable energy sources; and EIT ICT Labs (now EIT Digital) put emphasis not only on digital technology but on the future of social information sharing and communication.

Consolidation (2012-2013) 
The EIT’s main goal for 2012 was to move from an initial start-up phase to a consolidation of activities with the existing three KICs, as well as to start preparations for an enlarged KIC portfolio in the future. Scaling up was done through the pilot implementation of EIT-labelled degrees with the goal of creating role models for the kind of education it wanted to promote. That meant hands-on entrepreneurial education that addressed topical issues such as the climate crisis, finding alternative power source solutions, and technological advances to improve people’s lives.

All three KICs accelerated the enlargement of their project portfolio through MSc, Master’s, and Doctoral programmes. During these two years, EIT-labelled programmes allowed the EIT to raise awareness of its activities and value proposition for society among external stakeholders.

EIT as part of Horizon 2020 (2014-2020) 
Horizon 2020 was adapted in 2013 to reduce the fragmentation of European research and industry and refocus their efforts on UN SDG-related issues. Its implementation would be partly carried out by the EIT, who would use the KICs to overcome Europe’s fragmentation. The EIT’s budget was expanded to €2.7 billion for the 2014 to 2020 to meet Horizon 2020 objectives. 

Based on the Strategic Innovation Agenda (SIA) of the EIT for 2014-2020, a call for proposals was announced in 2014 with two distinct thematical areas. One was for innovation for healthy living and active ageing (EIT Health) and the second was raw materials - sustainable explorations, extraction, processing, recycling, and substitution (EIT RawMaterials). The SIA also set the themes for 2016 and 2018 calls to establish an additional three KICs in the themes of Food4Future (now EIT Food), added-value manufacturing (now EIT Manufacturing), and eco-friendly urban mobility (EIT Urban Mobility). During this period, the eight KIC EIT structure was established to contribute to a larger EU policy agenda and, specifically, Horizon 2020.

Additionally, the RIS Scheme was introduced as an answer to underrepresentation of innovation start-ups and education for entrepreneurs in non-EU countries. The scheme seeks out and nurtures new partnerships with research and education institutions in RIS countries. Its funding mobility programmes offer students, researchers, and entrepreneurs of any age the chance to gain new skills. In 2017, the EIT expanded the total EIT RIS countries to 18.

That same year, Forbes chose 18 EIT Community members for the annual ‘Forbes 30 under 30’ list.

In 2018, the EIT and its KICs established the EIT Global Outreach Programme, the first EIT Community-coordinated effort at the global level. It expanded the reach of the EIT Community to non-European partners.

In 2020, the EIT launched the EIT Crisis Response Initiative which mobilised 60 million in additional funding for the Community to launch new projects dealing directly with the COVID-19 pandemic and its socioeconomic fallout.

EIT as part of Horizon Europe (2021-2027) 
For the budget period of 2021-2027, the EIT was mandated by the EU Parliament and Council to deliver on Horizon Europe objectives.

Between 2021 – 2027, the EIT should: 

 Increase the impact of its activities
 Create two new KICs: 
 Cultural and Creative Sectors and Industries (already established in June 2022) and 
 Water, Marine and Maritime Sectors and Ecosystems 
 Put more emphasis on the regional dimensions of its activities by providing targeted support to countries who lag in innovation performance 
 Launch a new pilot initiative to increase the entrepreneurial and innovation capacity of higher education institutions.  

In March 2021, the EIT opened its liaison office in Brussels, ensuring close working ties with stakeholders like the EU Commission and the EU Parliament. 2021 also saw the launch of the HEI Initiative: Innovation Capacity Building for Higher Education, addressing one of the key objectives of the EIT’s SIA 2021-2027. The HEI Initiative helps coordinate cross-sectoral activities related to education and gives a wider circle of future entrepreneurs access to the EIT Community’s experience and knowledge. Several projects were developed through this initiative: Skills for Future, Girls go Circular, and Women in AgriFood.

In light of a full-scale war against Ukraine started by Russia on February, 24, 2022, the EIT together with several KICs initiated activities to help Ukrainians. These included providing traineeships and professional development, as well as initiating projects aimed at post-war reconstruction.

Budget 2021-2027 

In the EU Parliament and Council Decision of 20 May 2021, which sets the 2021-2027 EIT Agenda, the budget needs of the EIT were set at €2.965.000.000 €2.854.000.000 (96% of the total EIT budget) is envisaged to fund existing and new KICs, of which:

 at least  10% and a maximum of 15% shall be dedicated to the RIS
 a maximum  of 7% shall be dedicated to cross-KIC activities, including support for  KICs, for which the partnership agreement is expired or terminated
 a maximum of 3% shall be dedicated to a pilot higher education initiative of three years.

Collaborations 
The EIT signed a Memorandum of Understanding (MoU) with several European organisations:

 The European Union Agency for Law Enforcement Training, formerly known as European Police College (CEPOL) (27 October 2014)
 The Joint Research Centre (JRC) (22 September 2016)
 The European Union Intellectual Property Office (EUIPO) (8 October 2020)
 The European Innovation Council (EIC) (8 January 2021)
 The European Investment Fund (EIF) (20 September 2021)
 The European Investment Bank (EIB) (20 September 2021)

Companies supported by the EIT 

 Skeleton Technologies
 Northolt
 Spindiag

See also
 Agencies of the European Union
 Lisbon Strategy
 European Research Area (ERA)
 European Research Council (ERC)
 Framework Programmes for Research and Technological Development
 Science and Technology in Europe
 Joint Research Centre (JRC)
 European Innovation Council (EIC)
 European Investment Fund (EIF)
 European Investment Bank (EIB)
 European Union Intellectual Property Office (EUIPO)
 European Union Agency for Law Enforcement Training (CEPOL)

References

European Union and science and technology
Innovation organizations
International scientific organizations based in Europe
Research and development in Europe